is a former Japanese football player.

Club career
Yamaguchi was born in Joyo on June 11, 1983. He joined Nagoya Grampus Eight (later Nagoya Grampus) from youth team in 2002. He played many matches as defensive midfielder from first season. He became a regular player in 2006. He moved to JEF United Chiba in 2010. Although he played many matches, his opportunity to play decreased from 2012. He retired end of 2014 season.

National team career
In November 2003, Yamaguchi was selected Japan U-20 national team for 2003 World Youth Championship. At this tournament, he played 1 match.

Club statistics

References

External links

1983 births
Living people
Association football people from Kyoto Prefecture
Japanese footballers
Japan youth international footballers
J1 League players
J2 League players
Nagoya Grampus players
JEF United Chiba players
Association football midfielders